David Levi  may refer to:

 David Levi (Italy) (1816–1898), Italian-Jewish poet and politician
 David Levi (scholar) (1742–1801), Anglo-Jewish scholar
 David F. Levi (born 1951), Dean of Duke University Law School (United States) and former U.S. federal judge
 David Levi (musician) (born 1994), keyboardist of The Naked Brothers Band
 David Levi (poker player) (born 1962), professional poker player

See also
 David Levy (disambiguation)